Two-time defending champion Richard Sears defeated James Dwight in the final 6–2, 6–0, 9–7 to win the men's singles tennis title at the 1883 U.S. National Championships. Except for the final, each match was played on the best of three sets. Winner of a set was the player who won six games first, no two-games advantage was required. Participation was restricted to players who competed for US clubs.

Draw

Finals

Earlier rounds

Section 1

Section 2

References 

 

Men's singles
1883